(born December 26, 1971 in Akashi, Hyogo) is a retired female long-distance runner from Japan. She won the 1992 edition of the Osaka Ladies Marathon. She clocked a winning time of 2:26:26 on January 26, 1992. Later that year Kokamo competed at the 1992 Summer Olympics, finishing in 29th place in the women's marathon race.

Achievements
All results regarding marathon, unless stated otherwise

References

sports-reference

1971 births
Living people
Japanese female long-distance runners
Athletes (track and field) at the 1992 Summer Olympics
Olympic athletes of Japan
Olympic female marathon runners
Sportspeople from Hyōgo Prefecture
Japanese female marathon runners
People from Akashi, Hyōgo
20th-century Japanese women
21st-century Japanese women